Clickable map of the depopulated locations

During the 1947–1949 Palestine war around 400 Arab towns and villages were depopulated, with a majority being entirely destroyed and left uninhabitable.  Today these locations are all in Israel; many of the locations were repopulated by Jewish immigrants, with their place names replaced with  Hebrew place names.

Arabs remained in small numbers in some of the cities (Haifa, Jaffa and Acre); and Jerusalem was divided between Jordan and Israel. Around 30,000 Palestinians remained in Jerusalem in what became the Arab part of it (East Jerusalem). In addition, some 30,000 non-Jewish refugees relocated to East Jerusalem, while 5,000 Jewish refugees moved from the Old City to West Jerusalem on the Israeli side. An overwhelming number of the Arab residents who had lived in the cities that became a part of Israel and were renamed (Acre, Haifa, Safad, Tiberias, Ashkelon, Beersheba, Jaffa and Beisan) fled or were expelled. Most of the Palestinians who remain there are internally displaced people from the villages nearby.

A number of the towns and villages were destroyed by Israeli forces in the aftermath of the 1948 war, but it was not until 1965 that more than 100 remaining locations – including many of the largest depopulated places – were demolished by the Israel Land Administration.

There are more than 120 "village memorial books" documenting the history of the depopulated Palestinian villages. These books are based on accounts given by villagers. Rochelle A. Davis has described the authors as seeking "to pass on information about their villages and their values to coming generations".

The towns and villages listed below are arranged according to the subdistricts of Mandatory Palestine they were situated in.

Table

Other villages (not in table above)

Acre Subdistrict
 Sha'ab

Haifa Subdistrict
 Qisarya

Jerusalem Subdistrict
Romema

See also
 Causes of the 1948 Palestinian exodus
 Transfer Committee
 Plan Dalet
 Palestine refugee camps
 1948 Palestinian exodus from Lydda and Ramle
 List of villages depopulated during the Arab–Israeli conflict
 Jewish exodus from Arab and Muslim countries
 Syrian towns and villages depopulated in the Arab–Israeli conflict
 Killings and massacres during the 1948 Palestine war
 List of battles and operations in the 1948 Palestine war

Notes

References
 
 Ghazi Falah (1996) The 1948 Israeli-Palestinian War and its Aftermath: The Transformation and De-Signification of Palestine's Cultural Landscape, Annals of the Association of American Geographers, 86:2, 256–285, DOI: 10.1111/j.1467-8306.1996.tb01753.x
 
 
  See in particular pp. xiv–xviii, where Morris lists 389 Palestinian villages depopulated by massacres, expulsions, military assault, or flight.
 Morris, Benny. 1948: The First Arab–Israeli War. Yale University Press, 2008.
 
 Shavit, Ari. Deir Yasian: Survival of the Fittest, interview with Benny Morris, Haaretz, January 9, 2004.
 Davis, Rochelle A. (2011). Palestinian Village Histories: Geographies of the Displaced. Stanford University Press, Stanford, California. .

External links
 Palestine Remembered
 Deir Yassin Remembered
 iNakba is a mobile app enabling users to locate, learn and contribute information about Palestinian localities destroyed in 1948

 
Former populated places in the State of Palestine
Israeli–Palestinian conflict-related lists
Palestinian diaspora
Lists of populated places
Military operations of the Israeli–Palestinian conflict
1949 in Israel
1947 in Mandatory Palestine
1948 in Mandatory Palestine
1948 in All-Palestine (Gaza)
1948 in the West Bank Governorate
1948 Palestinian exodus